The women's team pursuit race of the 2013–14 ISU Speed Skating World Cup 4, arranged in Sportforum Hohenschönhausen, in Berlin, Germany, was held on 8 December 2013.

The Dutch team took their third straight victory from the start of the season, setting a new low-altitude record in the process, while the Polish team came second, and the South Korean team came third.

Results
The race took place on Sunday, 8 December, in the afternoon session, scheduled at 16:48.

References

Women team pursuit
4